Fagundes is a surname, and may refer to:
 Antônio Fagundes, Brazilian actor
 Sálvio Fagundes, Brazilian referee
 Catarina Fagundes, Portuguese Olympic athlete
 João Álvares Fagundes, Portuguese explorer
 Lygia Fagundes Telles, Brazilian novelist

As a placename, Fagundes, Paraiba is a municipality in northeast Brazil.